William Glenn Percy (December 10, 1928 – June 23, 2014) was an  American football coach.  He was the 24th head football coach at the Ottawa University in Ottawa, Kansas, serving for five seasons, from 1984 to 1988, and compiling a record of 21–29. After working in Ottawa for five seasons, Percy was hired by Hutchinson Community College of the Kansas Jayhawk Community College Conference (KJCCC).

Percy was the head football coach at Hutchinson High School from 1968 to 1971.  He also had two stints at the head football coach at Shawnee Mission East High School in Prairie Village, Kansas, from 1972 to 1978 and 1992 to 1999.

Death and honors
Percy died at his home in Iola, Kansas on June 23, 2014 at the age of 85. He was posthumously inducted into the Greater Kansas City Football Coaches Association Hall of Fame in 2018.

Head coaching record

College

References

1928 births
2014 deaths
Hutchinson Blue Dragons football coaches
Ottawa Braves football coaches
High school football coaches in Kansas
High school football coaches in Oklahoma
People from Iola, Kansas
Coaches of American football from Kansas